Circle Canyon is a 1933 American Western film directed by Victor Adamson and starring Buddy Roosevelt, June Mathews and Clarissa Woods.

Cast
 Buddy Roosevelt as Chris Morell 
 June Mathews as Clara Moore 
 Clarissa Woods as Lucy Morrell 
 John Tyke as Jim - Clara's Nephew 
 Allen Holbrook as Vic Byrd 
 Harry Leland as Mat 
 George Hazel as Sam Black 
 Clyde McClary as Pete - Henchman 
 Mark Hamson as Tom - Lucy's Father 
 Ernest Scott as Henchman 
 Victor Adamson as Express Agent 
 William McCall as Deputy 
 Bud Osborne as Sheriff

References

Bibliography
 Michael R. Pitts. Poverty Row Studios, 1929–1940: An Illustrated History of 55 Independent Film Companies, with a Filmography for Each. McFarland & Company, 2005.

External links
 

1933 films
1933 Western (genre) films
American Western (genre) films
Films directed by Victor Adamson
1930s English-language films
1930s American films